
Gmina Mikołajki is an urban-rural gmina (administrative district) in Mrągowo County, Warmian-Masurian Voivodeship, in northern Poland.

The gmina contains part of the protected area called Masurian Landscape Park.

Villages
Apart from the town of Mikołajki, Gmina Mikołajki contains the villages and settlements of Baranowo, Cimowo, Cudnochy, Dybowo, Faszcze, Górkło, Grabek, Grabnik, Grabnik Mały, Grabówek, Grabówka, Inulec, Jora Mała, Jora Wielka, Kolonia Mikołajki, Kulinowo, Lelek, Lisiny, Lisunie, Lubiewo, Łuknajno, Łuknajno-Leśniczówka, Małaszewo, Mateuszek, Nadawki, Nowe Sady, Olszewo, Osa, Prawdowo, Pszczółki, Sady, Śmietki, Śmietki Małe, Stawek, Tałty, Tałty SHR, Urwitałt, Woźnice, Zełwągi and Zielony Gaj.

Neighbouring gminas
Gmina Mikołajki is bordered by the gminas of Miłki, Mrągowo, Orzysz, Piecki, Pisz, Ruciane-Nida and Ryn.

References
Polish official population figures 2006

Mikolajki
Mrągowo County